About Face is the second solo studio album by English singer and musician David Gilmour, released on 5 March 1984 by Harvest in the UK and Columbia in the United States, a day before Gilmour's 38th birthday. Co-produced by Bob Ezrin and Gilmour, the album was recorded in 1983 at Pathé Marconi Studio, in Boulogne-Billancourt, France. The lyrics of two tracks, "All Lovers Are Deranged" and "Love on the Air", were written by Pete Townshend of the Who. Townshend's version of "All Lovers Are Deranged" appears on his solo album Scoop 3.

The album received positive reviews and peaked at number 21 on UK Albums Chart and number 32 on the US Billboard Top 200 Albums chart. Two singles were released: "Blue Light" peaked at number 62 in the United States, while "Love on the Air" failed to chart. Like Gilmour's self-titled debut solo album, About Face was certified gold by the RIAA. A remastered reissued CD was released in 2006 on EMI in Europe and Columbia for the rest of the world.

Recording
The album was recorded with engineer Andy Jackson at a time when Pink Floyd's future was uncertain. It was mixed by James Guthrie at Mayfair Studios in London, England.

Gilmour said he wanted to take his time and make "a really good album" and "get the best musicians in the world that I could get hold of to play with me." Musicians on the album include drummer Jeff Porcaro, bass guitarist Pino Palladino, Deep Purple keyboardist Jon Lord, backing vocalists Roy Harper, and Sam Brown, orchestral arranger Michael Kamen (who had also worked on The Pros and Cons of Hitch Hiking and The Wall), and keyboardist Steve Winwood.

Music and lyrics

Gilmour was later interviewed by Texas-based DJ Redbeard, on the radio program, In the Studio during which the focus was his 2006 third album On an Island. He commented on About Face saying that, "looking back on it, it has some great moments on there but the whole flavor of it is too '80s for my current tastes."

"Murder" was an outcry by Gilmour about the senseless killing of John Lennon, a longtime musical peer and inspiration to him. Gilmour embellished the song with a solo fretless bassline (played by Pino Palladino), adding an edgy funk groove to the acoustic beginning of the song, leading to an instrumental bridge, where the song picks up in the speed of the beat with more electric instruments. Gilmour collaborated with Townshend on the songs "Love on the Air" and "All Lovers Are Deranged," as Gilmour recalled: "I sent him three songs and he sent back three sets of lyrics. Two of them suited me well. One didn't. He did the two on About Face and he did the other one ['White City Fighting'] on his White City album." The lyrics for "Love on the Air" were written in a day, after Gilmour had asked for Townshend's help. "You Know I'm Right" was written in a similar vein to Lennon's "How Do You Sleep?" and was a dig towards Waters. "Cruise" was about Ronald Reagan having cruise missiles stationed in Britain at the time.

Cover art

The cover of the LP is a little wider than usual, approaching 12 1/2 inches. The inner sleeve bears lyrics and photographs of Gilmour, and exists in at least two variations. A sleeve for the UK Harvest edition has rounded corners and opens to the side; one for the USA Columbia edition has square corners and opens to the top, relative to the lyric text. Like the cover, the latter sleeve is wider than it is tall, and may not fit into the outer sleeve if turned 90 degrees. In one corner of both versions are printed the words "Fleudian slip," a play on the words "Freudian slip" and "Pink Floyd."

Release
The album featured the single "Love on the Air," with lyrics by Townshend, and the disco-style single "Blue Light", later remixed by François Kevorkian; "Blue Light" was released, backed with "Cruise", on 13 February 1984, while "Love on the Air", backed with "Let's Get Metaphysical" on 24 April. The album was released on 5 March in the UK, and on 6 March in the United States (coincidentally on Gilmour's 38th birthday). "All Lovers Are Deranged" and "Murder" were released as singles for North American rock radio; the former reaching #10 on Billboard'''s Mainstream Rock chart.

Critical reception
Writing for AllMusic, critic Tom Demalon wrote of the album "The songs on About Face' show a pop sensibility that Pink Floyd rarely was concerned with achieving," adding that "About Face is a well-honed rock album that is riveting from beginning to end."

 Live performances

Gilmour performed tracks from the album on his 1984 tour, and performed "Love on the Air" and "Blue Light" in 1985 as a member of Townshend's supergroup, Deep End, a recording of which became Townshend's live album Live: Brixton Academy '85.

Track listing

The 2006 remaster has longer fadeouts for "Until We Sleep" and "Near the End" at 5:20 and 5:50, respectively.

Versions of "Blue Light":
"Blue Light" (Single edit) – 3:52
"Blue Light" (12" Mix), from the "Blue Light" 12" promo single) – 6:10
"Blue Light" (Instrumental version), B-side of "Blue Light" 12" promo single – 6:13

Unused track
Another piece of music written for the album was not used by Gilmour.

He asked Roy Harper and separately, Pete Townshend, to supply lyrics, but felt that those provided were not messages that he could relate to. Harper subsequently used the tune, with his lyrics, as "Hope", on his 1985 album, Whatever Happened to Jugula?. Townshend used it with his lyrics as "White City Fighting", which has a markedly faster tempo, on his 1985 album White City: A Novel, on which Gilmour plays.

Personnel

Main personnel
David Gilmour – lead vocals, guitar, bass, production
Jeff Porcaro – drums, percussion
Pino Palladino – bass 
Ian Kewley – Hammond organ, piano (except for "Blue Light" sessions)

Additional personnel
Steve Winwood – Hammond organ on "Blue Light", piano on "Love on the Air"
Anne Dudley – synthesisers
Jon Lord – synthesisers
Bob Ezrin – keyboards, orchestral arrangement, production
Steve Rance – Fairlight CMI programming
The Kick Horns – brass
Luís Jardim – percussion
Ray Cooper – percussion
Roy Harper – backing vocals
Sam Brown – backing vocals
Vicki Brown – backing vocals
Mickey Feat – backing vocals
The National Philharmonic Orchestra
Michael Kamen – orchestral arrangement

Technical personnel
Andrew Jackson – engineer
Kit Woolven – engineer
James Guthrie – mix engineer; remastering
Eric Tomlinson – orchestration recorder
Doug Sax – mastering engineer
Mike Reese – mastering engineer
Storm Thorgerson (credited as STd (Storm Thorgerson Design)) – cover design

Tour
The supporting tour for About Face'', which lasted from 31 March – 16 July 1984, covering Europe and North America saw Gilmour perform the following songs:

"Until We Sleep"
"All Lovers Are Deranged"
"There's No Way Out of Here"
"Love on the Air"
"Mihalis"
"Cruise"
"Short & Sweet"
"Run Like Hell"
"Out of the Blue"
"Let's Get Metaphysical"
"You Know I'm Right"
"Money" (North American shows only)
"Blue Light"
"Murder"
Encore: 

 "Near the End"
 "Comfortably Numb"
"I Can't Breathe Anymore" (played as a third encore occasionally)

Tour personnel
David Gilmour – guitars, vocals, piano on "Out of the Blue"
Mick Ralphs – guitars, vocals, piano on "Let's Get Metaphysical"
Mickey Feat – bass guitar, vocals
Gregg Dechert – keyboards, vocals
Chris Slade – drums, percussion
Jody Linscott – percussion (March–June)
Sue Evans – percussion (5–16 July)
Raphael Ravenscroft – saxophones, flute, keyboards

Roy Harper (vocals) and Nick Mason (drums) joined Gilmour for his shows at the Hammersmith Odeon on 28, 29 and 30 April 1984, which were filmed.

Charts

References

External links

David Gilmour albums
1984 albums
Columbia Records albums
Albums produced by Bob Ezrin
Albums produced by David Gilmour
Harvest Records albums
Albums with cover art by Storm Thorgerson
Albums with cover art by Hipgnosis